Alexis Rodríguez Hernández (born 27 April 1977) is a Spanish former road cyclist, who competed as a professional between 2001 and 2011. He competed in the 2001 and 2003 Giro d'Italia.

Major results

2002
 1st Stage 8 Volta a Portugal
2004
 1st  Overall Cinturón a Mallorca
1st Mountains classification
 Troféu Joaquim Agostinho
1st Mountains classification
1st Stage 3
 3rd Overall Circuito Montañes
1st Mountains classification
 9th Clásica Internacional Txuma
2005
 1st  Mountains classification, Vuelta a Castilla y León
2007
 1st Mountains classification, GP Internacional Paredes Rota dos Móveis
 5th Overall Troféu Joaquim Agostinho
2008
 4th Overall Troféu Joaquim Agostinho
 6th Overall GP Internacional Paredes Rota dos Móveis

References

External links

1977 births
Living people
Spanish male cyclists
Sportspeople from Bouches-du-Rhône
Cyclists from Provence-Alpes-Côte d'Azur
French people of Spanish descent
Sportspeople from Salamanca
French emigrants to Spain
Cyclists from Castile and León
Spanish male marathon runners
Spanish male triathletes
21st-century Spanish people